International Broadcasting Convention, more commonly known by its initials IBC, is  an annual trade show, held in September at the RAI Exhibition and Convention Centre in Amsterdam, the Netherlands. IBC's tagline is “By the industry. For the industry.” and it is aimed at broadcasters, content creators/providers, equipment manufacturers, professional and technical associations, and other participants in the broadcasting, entertainment and technology industry. In addition to being a trade show showcasing hundred of exhibitors there is an IBC conference, panel discussions, demo’s, technical paper presentations and speaker sessions to attend. 
IBC is an independent body, owned by six partner bodies: IABM, IEEE, IET, RTS, SCTE and SMPTE, with a full-time professional staff.

IBC 2019 marked the launch of their new Accelerator Programme, purposed towards providing a framework for collaborative and fast-track innovation through a multi-company project-based approach to solve complex media and entertainment business and technology challenges. Many exciting and successful projects have emerged from this programme which have explored areas including 5G and the Cloud. 

The 2019 show marked the last in-person show for 2 years due to the COVID-19 outbreak, although a digital show was held in 2021. IBC returned on the 9-12th September 2022 with 37,071 visitors from over 170 countries gathering in Amsterdam to reconnect face-to-face again. New to this year's show was the CHANGEMAKERS Programme which included 2 days of content from trailblazing organisations and initiatives changing the culture of the industry and pushing the boundaries of creativity and technology. Sessions notably addressed topics on sustainability, diversity and inclusion.  

Other IBC2022 show features included: a world-class line-up of over 250 headline speakers, notably this year's keynote Nonny de la Peña (‘The Godmother of Virtual Reality’); the Showcase Theatre, where leading technology brands demonstrated how they are paving the way forward; thought leadership presentations, panels, masterclasses, demos and case studies on the Content Everywhere Stage. 

The dates for IBC 2023’s return have been announced as the 15-18 September 2023.

Dates

2009 
 Conference: 10–14 September 2009
 Exhibition: 11–15 September 2009

2010 
 Conference: 9–14 September 2010
 Exhibition: 10–14 September 2010

2011 
 Conference: 8–13 September 2011
 Exhibition: 9–13 September 2011

2012 
 Conference: 6–11 September 2012
 Exhibition: 7–11 September 2012

2013 
 Conference: 12–17 September 2013
 Exhibition: 13–17 September 2013

2014 
 Conference: 11–15 September 2014
 Exhibition: 12–16 September 2014

2015 
 Conference: 10–14 September 2015
 Exhibition: 11–15 September 2015

2016 
 Conference: 8–12 September 2016
 Exhibition: 9–13 September 2016

2017 
 Conference: 13–17 September 2017
 Exhibition: 14–18 September 2017

2018 
 Conference: 14–18 September 2018
 Exhibition: 15–19 September 2018

2019 
 Conference: 13–17 September 2019
 Exhibition: 13–17 September 2019

2020 
The 2020 edition of the show was originally scheduled for 11–15 September 2020, but was cancelled due to the COVID-19 pandemic.

2021 
The 2021 edition of the show was originally scheduled for 3-6 December 2021, but was cancelled due to the COVID-19 pandemic and a digital show was held in its place.

2022 
 Conference: 9–10 September 2022
 Exhibition: 9–12 September 2022

References

External links
 

Broadcasting associations
Trade fairs in the Netherlands
International broadcasting
Recurring events established in 1967
1967 establishments in the Netherlands